John Retallack (born 1950) is a British playwright and director.

Education 
He studied at St Paul's School in London (1963–68) and later at St Paul's College of Education, Cheltenham, Gloucestershire, where he took the Double English course (aimed at future secondary school English teachers) for his C.Ed. qualification (awarded summer 1973), and English and Education for his B.Ed. (awarded summer 1974). At St Paul's he was already active in the arts, organising a number of literary events during his stay.

Career 
He is the author of twelve plays for young people and has adapted numerous texts for the stage and for radio.

Oberon Books publish four of his plays for Company of Angels (Hannah & Hanna, Risk, Club Asylum and Virgins). Methuen publish Sweetpeter. His plays have been translated and published in several languages and are performed in Germany, Austria, Sweden, Holland and France.

He was the founding director of ATC Theatre (1977–85) which continues today as a National Portfolio client of the Arts Council of England.

John was formerly director of Oldham Coliseum Theatre (1985–88) and Oxford Stage Company (1989–99) where his adaptation of Melvin Burgess’s Junk won the TMA Young People's Award in 1998. His Shakespeare productions for Oxford Stage Company toured internationally and won widespread critical acclaim over a period of ten years.

From 2001- 2011 he was the founding director of Company of Angels, now operating under the name Boundless Theatre, which produces new and experimental work for young audiences and continues today as a National Portfolio client of the Arts Council of England.

From 2010 - 2013, he was Associate Director at Bristol Old Vic where he remains Artistic Associate.

In 2013, he became Tutor in Writing for Performance at Ruskin College in Oxford.

In 2015, he will revive his 2014 production of DIDO & AENEAS for Bristol Old Vic/English Concert and spend two months with the 'reseau europeen des centres culturels de rencontre' at La Chartreuse de Neuville in France researching a play about the current plight of refugees in Calais.

Awards
 1978:Edinburgh Festival Fringe First
 1983: Laurence Olivier Award for Best Newcomer in a Play
 1998:  TMA Young People's Award 
 2001: Herald Angel at the 2001 Edinburgh Festival
 2010: Herald Angel at the 2010 Edinburgh Festival

Works
Early adaptations for ATC

1978 - 80
Don Juan (adaptation from Byron's poem)
ATC National tour 
Edinburgh Festival
Avignon Festival
Fringe First Award
International tour with British Council

1981 - 83
Don Quixote parts 1 & 2 with Richard Curtis (adaptation from the novel) 
ATC National Tour
Edinburgh Festival
Almeida & Donmar Warehouse
Olivier Award 
International tour with British Council to over 20 countries including New York

1982 - 83
Berlin Berlin (adaptation from Robert Musil's The Man Without Qualities) 
Edinburgh Festival
ATC National tour
International tour with British Council including Berlin

1983
Ubu The Vandalist (adaptation from Alfred Jarry's plays)
ATC National Tour
Edinburgh Festival
International tour with British Council

1985
Hamlet
National Drama Conservatoire, New Delhi (for British Council)

Adaptations for Oxford Stage Company

(1989 – 1999
Directed 14 plays by Shakespeare 
Oxford Stage Company
National tours throughout UK
International tours to Japan and Far East)

1998 
Junk (adaptation of Melvyn Burgess’ novel) 
Oxford Stage Company 1998/2000 Oxford Playhouse & National Tour 
1999 Winner of TMA award/ Best New Show for Young People 1999
2000 Bergen Theatre, Norway
Published by Methuen

2000 
The Plague (adaptation of Camus’ novel)
Dundee Rep

Company of Angels

2001 
Hannah and Hanna
Company of Angels tour in UK and Edinburgh 2001 - 2003
Edinburgh Festival
Winner of Herald Angel Award
TMA Award/Best New Show for Young People nominee
2004 – 2005 British Council tours to India, Malaysia and The Philippines
2002—World Service radio
Published by Oberon, English Centre, Frenchs and Editions Fontaine
Translated & produced in French, Swedish, German, Dutch, Portuguese, Hebrew & 
Japanese
Over 200 performances in Sweden and 100 in Belgium

2002 
The Toll Bridge (adaptation of Aidan Chamber's novel)
Reading at Soho Theatre

2002/2013 
Wild Girl
2002 Company of Angels/ Quicksilver tour 
2004 Wederzijds tour of Holland & Belgium 
2004 Runner-up/Hans Snoek Award, Amsterdam
2013 Bristol Old Vic tour in co-production with Theatre Royal, Bath, Dukes 
Playhouse, Lancaster and Theatre Iolo, Cardiff
Translated & produced in French and Dutch

2002 
Club Asylum
Company of Angels tour of Scotland
Tron Theatre Glasgow
Published by Oberon
Translated in French

2003 
The Foundling
Brighton Theatre Company tour of South-East

2003 
Common Ground 
Cardboard Citizens tour for homeless people in London

2004 
Ballroom 
National Tour
Riverside Studios London
Translated in French

2004 
Sweetpeter  (with Usifu Jalloh)
Company of Angels National Tour
Polka Theatre London
Translated & performed in French
Published by Methuen

2005 
Virgins 
Company of Angels National Tour
Edinburgh Festival
Translated and performed in French, Swedish, German
Published by Oberon
Over 150 performances in Sweden

2006 
Risk 
Company of Angels Scottish & English tour
Tron Theatre Glasgow
Translated and performed in French and German
Published by Oberon and Les Solitaires Intempestifs
2008 Theater an der Parkaue Berlin
2012 Compagnie L’Interlude Tour of France 
2013 Avignon Festival

2007
A Bridge to the Stars 
Cottesloe Theatre
National Theatre Connections Festival
2008 Radio 4 Afternoon play

2009
Apples (Adapted from Richard Milward's novel)
Company of Angels & Northern Stage Newcastle
National Tour
Edinburgh Festival
Winner of Herald Angel Award

2010
Arlo
Public Reading for Company of Angels Theatre Café 
Southwark Playhouse

2011
Truant 
National Theatre of Scotland & Company of Angels
Glasgow tour

2012
Pictures at an Exhibition
Bristol Old Vic Young Company

2013
The Last Days of Mankind with Toby Hulse (adapted from original text by Karl Kraus)
Bristol Old Vic/Bristol Old Vic Theatre School

2013
The Outsider (adapted from Albert Camus’ novel)
Radio 3 
90 minute broadcast on centenary of Camus’ birth 3.11.13

Arlo
Radio 4 
Afternoon Play 26.11.13

References

1950 births
Living people
English dramatists and playwrights
English theatre directors
English male dramatists and playwrights
Laurence Olivier Award winners